Liang Chen and Lu Jingjing were the defending champions, but chose not to compete together. Lu played alongside You Xiaodi, but lost in the quarterfinals to Liang and Ye Qiuyu. Liang and Ye then lost in the semifinals to Jiang Xinyu and Tang Qianhui.

Jiang and Tang went on to win the title, defeating Alla Kudryavtseva and Arina Rodionova in the final, 6–3, 6–2.

Seeds

Draw

Draw

References
Main Draw

Jiangxi International Women's Tennis Open - Doubles
Jiangxi International Women's Tennis Open